Willem Andries Stephanus Roberts (born 20 March 1985) is a former South African rugby union footballer whose regular playing position was loosehead prop.

He retired at the end of the 2016 season.

External links 

itsrugby.co.uk profile

Living people
1985 births
South African rugby union players
Rugby union props
Rugby union players from Bloemfontein
Free State Cheetahs players
Griquas (rugby union) players
Alumni of Grey College, Bloemfontein
University of the Free State alumni